The 2006 Women's Youth World Handball Championship was the first edition of the tournament and took place in Sherbrooke, Quebec, Canada from 11 to 20 August 2006.  Denmark won the final against Korea.

Draw

  withdrew from the tournament after the draw of preliminary groups.

Group A

Points table

Results of group A

Group B

Points table

Results of group B

Knockout stage

Semifinal matches

FT : 28-28 ; ET 1 : 6-4

Bronze-medal match

Gold-medal match

Final standings

Awards

References

External links
Official website

Women's Youth World Handball Championship
Women's Youth World Handball Championship
2006
International handball competitions hosted by Canada
Women's handball in Canada
Youth World Handball Championship
August 2006 sports events in Canada